Ab Shib (also Romanized as Āb Shīb; also known as Ābshi) is a village in Hashivar Rural District, in the Central District of Darab County, Fars Province, Iran. At the 2006 census, its population was 749, in 153 families.

References 

Populated places in Darab County